Parliamentary elections were held in the Kingdom of Dalmatia in 1876. The People's Party won with a record-largest majority of 30 seats in the 41 seat assembly. During the course of the government's mandate, Serb members of the People's Party formed their own Serb Party.

Results

Elections in Croatia
Dalmatia
1876 in Croatia
Elections in Austria-Hungary
History of Dalmatia
Election and referendum articles with incomplete results